Vrhovo pri Šentlovrencu ( or) is a small settlement in the Municipality of Trebnje in eastern Slovenia. It lies on the left bank of the Temenica River west of Šentlovrenc. The area is part of the historical region of Lower Carniola. The municipality is now included in the Southeast Slovenia Statistical Region.

Name
The name of the settlement was changed from Vrhovo to Vrhovo pri Šentlovrencu in 1953. In the past the German name was Werchow.

References

External links
Vrhovo pri Šentlovrencu at Geopedia

Populated places in the Municipality of Trebnje